William Mackesy (8 April 1880 – 12 November 1956) was an Irish dual player of Gaelic games, a hurler and a footballer. At club level he played with Lees and Blackrock and was a member of the Cork senior teams in both codes. Mackessy is one of only fifteen players to have won All-Ireland medals in both codes.

Career
Mackesy first came to prominence playing with Cork city-based clubs Blackrock and Lees. In a 12-year span from 1902 to 1914 he won a combined total of 13 County Championship medals across both codes including three hurling-football doubles. Mackesy first appeared on the inter-county scene as a member of the Cork senior football team in 1901. His debut season with the Cork senior hurling team two years later ended with him claiming a winners' medal after a defeat of London in the All-Ireland final. Mackesy became Cork's first dual All-Ireland medal-winner in 1911 when he lined out with the Cork senior footballers in their All-Ireland final defeat of Antrim. After making 43 championship appearances he retired from inter-county duty in 1912, by which time Mackesy had also claimed six Munster Championship medals across both codes.

Personal life
Mackesy was born in Buttevant, County Cork but began his business career after moving to Kinsale. He later worked as a draper in the Munster Arcade in Cork city before opening his first licensed premises in 1912. He opened a second on Oliver Plunkett Street six years later. Mackesy married Anne Glavin on 24 February 1914 and the couple had six children.

Mackesy died at the Bon Secours Hospital in Cork on 12 November 1956. He had been in a ill health for a number of years with diabetes.

Honours
Blackrock
Cork Senior Hurling Championship: 1903, 1908, 1910, 1911, 1912, 1913

Lees
Cork Senior Football Championship: 1902, 1903, 1904, 1907, 1908, 1911, 1914

Cork
All-Ireland Senior Hurling Championship: 1903
All-Ireland Senior Football Championship: 1911
Munster Senior Hurling Championship: 1903, 1905, 1912
Munster Senior Football Championship: 1901, 1906, 1907 (c)

References

1880 births
1956 deaths
Blackrock National Hurling Club hurlers
Lees Gaelic footballers
Cork inter-county Gaelic footballers
Cork inter-county hurlers
Drinking establishment owners
Dual players
People with diabetes
All-Ireland Senior Hurling Championship winners
Winners of one All-Ireland medal (Gaelic football)
Gaelic games players from County Cork